Salvador "Salva" Ferrer Canals (born 21 January 1998) is a Spanish professional footballer who plays as a right-back for Serie A club Spezia.

Club career
Born in Sant Joan Samora, Barcelona, Catalonia, Ferrer represented RCD Espanyol, UFB Jàbac Terrassa, CF Martorell – where he made his senior debut in the Tercera Catalana – and CF Damm as a youth. On 10 July 2017, he signed a two-year contract with Gimnàstic de Tarragona, being assigned to the farm team in the Tercera División.

Ferrer made his debut for Pobla on 17 September 2017, coming on as a second-half substitute for Pol Valentín in a 1–0 home win against FC Vilafranca. He scored his first goal the following 22 April, netting the game's only in an away defeat of FC Santboià.

Ferrer made his professional debut on 7 October 2018, replacing Roger Figueras in a 1–1 away draw against Cádiz CF in the Segunda División. The following 21 January, after establishing himself as a starter under Enrique Martín, he renewed his contract until 2021.

On 9 August 2019, Ferrer was transferred to Italian Serie B side Spezia Calcio, and signed a four-year deal with the club.

References

External links

1998 births
Living people
People from Baix Llobregat
Sportspeople from the Province of Barcelona
Spanish footballers
Footballers from Catalonia
Association football defenders
Segunda División players
Tercera División players
Serie A players
Serie B players
CF Damm players
CF Pobla de Mafumet footballers
Gimnàstic de Tarragona footballers
Spezia Calcio players
Spanish expatriate footballers
Spanish expatriate sportspeople in Italy
Expatriate footballers in Italy
Catalonia international footballers